Jordan Hermann is a South African cricketer. He made his first-class debut on 29 October 2021, for Titans in the 2021–22 CSA 4-Day Series.

References

External links
 

Living people
Year of birth missing (living people)
South African cricketers
Titans cricketers
Place of birth missing (living people)